Bácskai Újság may refer to:

 Bácskai Újság (1899), a Hungarian language daily newspaper
 Bácskai Újság (1935), a Hungarian language daily political newspaper